Leo Richard Goehring (November 5, 1891 – February 5, 1967) was an American  track and field athlete who competed in the 1912 Summer Olympics. He was born in New York City and died in Bronx, New York. In 1912 he finished fourth in the standing high jump event and fifth in the standing long jump competition.

References

External links
profile

1891 births
1967 deaths
American male high jumpers
American male long jumpers
Olympic track and field athletes of the United States
Athletes (track and field) at the 1912 Summer Olympics